The Head of the Republic of Karelia is the federal official appointed by the Russian Government on the federal level, or by the President of the Russian Federation in their own right who serves as the head of state of Republic of Karelia. Since the fall of the Soviet Union, four people have served as Heads of the Republic.

Chairman of the Supreme Council

Chairmen of the Government

Head of the Republic

References 
 Russian Administrative divisions

Politics of the Republic of Karelia
 
Karelia